Central Independent School District is a public school district based in the community of Pollok, Texas (USA).  In addition to Central, a small portion goes into the city of Lufkin.

In 2009, the school district was rated "academically acceptable" by the Texas Education Agency.

History
Central Independent School District traces its origin to 1929 via the consolidation of five small schools that were located in the Pollok-Central area: Union, Durant, Pollok, Clawson and Allentown under the name Central Consolidated Common School District. By the 1939-1940 school year, the Cordaway Springs and Simpson schools had also merged with Central Consolidated. In 1955, Central converted from a Common School District to an Independent School District.

Schools
Central ISD has three campuses - Central High (Grades 9-12), Central Junior High (Grades 5-8), and Central Elementary (Grades EE-4). Two campuses, along with the administration building, are located at one campus on U.S. Highway 69N approximately seven miles north of Lufkin, Texas.
The third campus, a new elementary building, is located just 1/2 mile north on HWY 69.

References

External links

School districts in Angelina County, Texas
School districts established in 1929